The baudline time-frequency browser is a signal analysis tool designed for scientific visualization. It runs on several Unix-like operating systems under the X Window System. Baudline is useful for real-time spectral monitoring, collected signals analysis, generating test signals, making distortion measurements, and playing back audio files.


Applications
 Acoustic cryptanalysis
 Audio codec lossy compression analysis 
 Audio signal processing
 Bioacoustics research
 Data acquisition (DAQ)
 Gravitational Wave analysis
 Infrasound monitoring
 Musical acoustics
 radar
 Seismic data processing
 SETI
 Signal analysis
 Software Defined Radio
 Spectral analysis
 Very low frequency (VLF) reception
 WWV frequency measurement

Features
 Spectrogram, Spectrum, Waveform, and Histogram displays
 Fourier, Correlation, and Raster transforms
 SNR, THD, SINAD, ENOB, SFDR distortion measurements
 Channel equalization
 Function generator
 Digital down converter
 Audio playing with real-time DSP effects like speed control, pitch scaling, frequency shifting, matrix surround panning, filtering, and digital gain boost
 Audio recording of multiple channels
 JACK Audio Connection Kit sound server support
 Import AIFF, AU, WAV, FLAC, MP3, Ogg Vorbis, AVI, MOV, and other file formats

License
The old baudline version comes with no warranty and is free to download. The binaries may be used for any purpose, though no form of redistribution is permitted. The new baudline version is available via a subscription model and site license.

See also
 Linux audio software
 List of information graphics software
 List of numerical analysis software
 Digital signal processing

References

External links
 
 User discussion group at Google Groups
 SigBlips DSP Engineering

Time–frequency analysis
Linux media players
Acoustics software
Numerical software
Unix software
Audio software with JACK support
Science software for Linux
Science software for macOS
Audio software for Linux